Sphrageidus is a genus of tussock moths in the family Erebidae. It is considered a synonym of the related genus Euproctis by some authors, but still recognized as valid by others (e.g.), and supported as distinct in molecular phylogenetic studies.

Species
Sphrageidus fervida (Walker, 1863)
Sphrageidus incommoda (Butler, 1882)
Sphrageidus lemuria (Hering, 1926)
Sphrageidus perixesta (Collenette, 1954)
Sphrageidus producta (Walker, 1863)
Sphrageidus pusillima (Strand, 1912)
Sphrageidus putilla (Saalmüller, 1884)
Sphrageidus similis (Füssli, 1775)
Sphrageidus simlensis (Gupta, 1986)
Sphrageidus virguncula (Walker, 1855)
Sphrageidus xanthorrhoea (Kollar, 1848)

References

Lymantriinae
Noctuoidea genera